Coryanthes boyi, also known by the common name Boy's Coryanthese, is a species of epiphytic bucket orchid boasting green flowers dotted with tight purple-brown blotches. It is native to Venezuela and northern Brazil growing at an elevations of 1000 to 1500 meters. No subspecies are listed in the Catalogue of Life.

References

Notizblatt des Botanischen Gartens und Museums zu Berlin-Dahlem 10: 381. 1928. (Notizbl. Bot. Gart. Berlin-Dahlem)
Brazil Flora Group. 2015. Growing knowledge: an overview of Seed Plant diversity in Brazil. Rodriguésia 66(4): 1085–1113.

boyi
Orchids of Brazil
Orchids of Venezuela